Queen's Dock is a dock on the River Mersey and part of the Port of Liverpool. It is situated in the southern dock system, connected to Wapping Dock to the north and Coburg Dock to the south.

History
The dock was designed by Henry Berry and opened in 1785. The dock was named in honour of Queen Charlotte, the consort of George III, and it was later expanded by John Foster, Sr. At its largest, the dock consisted of a main basin and two branch docks, which were separated by a graving dock. Branch Dock Number 2 (to the north) has since been filled in and is used as a car park. The graving dock is now straddled by an apartment block, The Keel, which was formerly the HM Revenue and Customs building.

This and the other docks in the southern system were owned by British Waterways, transferred to the Canal & River Trust in 2012.

References

Sources

Further reading

External links

 
   Queen's Dock aerial photo

Liverpool docks